Markus Wasmeier (born 9 September 1963  is a former World Cup alpine ski racer from Germany. He was World champion and two times Olympic champion.

Career 
At the 1985 World Championships at Bormio, Italy, he won the Giant Slalom at age 21, before recording a World Cup victory.

Born in Schliersee, Bavaria, West Germany, Wasmeier's first World Cup Race was on 5 February 1983, when he finished 49th in the Downhill Race at St. Anton am Arlberg. He gained his first World Cup points in January 1984 by capturing 10th place in the Alpine Combined at Garmisch-Partenkirchen, and that December, he achieved his first podium in (Giant Slalom at Sestiere, Italy). In a downhill race on February 1987 at Furano, Japan, he broke two vertebrae and missed the rest of the season.

Wasmeier won a total of nine World Cup races, starting with two victories on 9 February 1986, in the Combined and Super-G events at Morzine, France.

The surprising result of double Olympic gold for Wasmeier at age thirty gained him the title of 1994 "Sportsman of the Year" in Germany,

World Cup results

Season standings

Season titles

Individual races
9 wins (2 DH, 6 SG, 1 K)

World championship results

Olympic results

After racing
After retiring from competitive skiing, Wasmeier founded the farm and winter sport museum Bauernhof- und Wintersportmuseum Schliersee on 1 May 2007, and he has remained its curator and patron ever since. The museum provides insight into traditional Bavarian peasant life and aims to preserve old traditions by communicating them to coming generations.

In 2009, Wasmeier shared his passion for building restoration and preserving tradition with an international group of young people through his involvement with the D&F Academy (now The DO School). Wasmeier worked with an international group of young people to restore a 17th-century farmhouse in the German Alps utilizing original materials, traditional tools, wood-crafting and handicraft techniques.  He remains involved with the DO School as an advisor and supporter.

From 1993 to 1994, he was a commentator for the German Television Broadcaster ARD until 2007 and from 2008 until 2014. He is a consultant in the German Skiing Federation since 2000. Married since 1991, his wife Brigitte is a South Tyrolian.

References

External links
 
 Markus Wasmeier World Cup standings at the International Ski Federation
 
 
  

1963 births
Living people
People from Miesbach (district)
Sportspeople from Upper Bavaria
German male alpine skiers
Alpine skiers at the 1988 Winter Olympics
Alpine skiers at the 1992 Winter Olympics
Alpine skiers at the 1994 Winter Olympics
Olympic alpine skiers of West Germany
Olympic alpine skiers of Germany
Olympic medalists in alpine skiing
FIS Alpine Ski World Cup champions
Medalists at the 1994 Winter Olympics
Olympic gold medalists for Germany